The Bulgarian diaspora includes  Bulgarians living outside Bulgaria and its surrounding countries, as well as immigrants from Bulgaria abroad.

The number of Bulgarians outside Bulgaria has sharply increased since 1989, following the Revolutions of 1989 in Central and Eastern Europe. Over one million Bulgarians have left the country, either permanently or as a temporary workforce, leading to a marked decline in its population. Many took advantage of the US green card lottery system. Also, many Bulgarians immigrated to Canada using the advantage of the Canadian immigration point system for skilled workers. Others went across the European Union. In countries such as Germany and Spain where many Bulgarians work and stay there intermittently, while retaining Bulgaria as their permanent residence. This trend increased following the 2007 enlargement of the European Union, when Bulgaria became a European Union member state.

Most of the causes for the spread of the post-1990s Bulgarian diaspora throughout the EU member states and North America have been related to work and education. Therefore, the majority of the emigrants have been allowed residence in other countries on skilled worker or student basis. That includes people of various skills - lower education workers (which usually deal with utilities and housekeeping), plumbers, construction workers, gardeners, handymen, maids, as well as a substantial amount of higher-education specialists - usually from the areas of engineering, computer science, chemistry and medicine.

The largest communities of the Bulgarian diaspora in the Western part of the European Union are in Spain,  Germany, the United Kingdom, France and Italy.

Other places that attracted Bulgarian immigration are Australia, New Zealand, South America (especially Argentina and Brazil), South Africa, and some expats in United Arab Emirates.

The numbers of Bulgarians living abroad has been reported in vastly different numbers by varying groups such as the government and various NGOs, leading to some criticism.

See also
Bulgarians
List of Bulgarians
Bulgarian Americans
Bulgarian Canadians
Bulgarians in South America
Bulgarian Australian 
Bulgarians in Germany
Bulgarians in Serbia 
Bulgarians in the United Kingdom
Banat Bulgarians
Bessarabian Bulgarians
Macedonian Bulgarians
Bulgarian Eastern Orthodox Diocese of the USA, Canada and Australia

References

External links
 Data

 
European diasporas